Shakin' the Cage  is an album by Fleetwood Mac drummer Mick Fleetwood's spin-off band The Zoo, released in June 1992. The album features Bekka Bramlett who would join Fleetwood Mac the following year as well as two of Fleetwood Mac's touring musicians; Isaac Asante and Brett Tuggle. The title track was co-written by then-Fleetwood Mac member Billy Burnette. The album was chiefly written by Australian star Billy Thorpe who features in the band.

Track listing

Personnel
Mick Fleetwood – Drums & percussion
Bekka Bramlett – Vocals
Billy Thorpe – Guitar, vocals, synth & percussion, 
Gregg Wright – Guitar & backing vocals
Tom Lilly – Bass & backing vocals
Brett Tuggle – Keyboards & backing vocals
Isaac Asante – Percussion on "In Your Hands"
Delaney & Bonnie – Backing vocals on "In Your Hands"
Kenny Gradney – Bass on "How Does It Feel"

Production
Produced by Mick Fleetwood and Billy Thorpe
Engineered by Billy Thorpe, Ken Allardyce, Rail Jon Rogut, Bob Loftus, Eric Rudd, Allen Sides

References

Mick Fleetwood albums
1992 albums
Albums produced by Mick Fleetwood